The fourth series of the music talent show The X Factor Greece began airing on Skai TV on 4 April 2016, The show was presented for a second year by Sakis Rouvas. It was also broadcast abroad via SKAI's international stations.

Selection process
Public auditions by aspiring pop singers began in February 2016 and were held in two cities; Athens and Thessaloniki.
All four series 4 judges, Thodoris Marantinis, George Theofanous, Tamta, Peggy Zina returned to judge the contestants. Following initial auditions, in February 2016, around 200 acts attended the boot camp. The contestants were initially split into groups of three, and judges gave instant decisions on who would leave based on the group performances, bringing the number of acts down to 150. The judges then cut the number of acts down to 80. These were split into four categories: Boys, Girls, Over 25s and Groups, before the judges discovered which category they would mentor for the rest of the competition.
In series 2, the Boys (16–24) are being mentored by George Theofanous, Tamta has the Girls (16–24), Peggy Zina mentors the Over 25s, and Thodoris Marantinis takes charge of the Groups. At the last stage of boot camp, the 80 acts were reduced to 32. After an emotional "Four Chair Challenge", the 32 acts were reduced to 16, who went on to the live finals, with one act being eliminated each week by a combination of public vote and judges' decision until a winner was found. There was an exception for the first live show, where four acts, one from each category, were eliminated.

Contestants and categories
The top 16 acts were confirmed as follows:

Key;
 – Winner
 – Runner-up
 – Third Place

Results summary

Key:

Greece 04
2016 Greek television seasons